Ischalis fortinata is a species of moth in the family Geometridae. It was first described by Achille Guenée in 1868. This species is endemic to New Zealand.

Description
The mature larva of this species is a reddish-brown colour, has a hairy appearance, and is between 25 - 30 mm long.

Behaviour
The adult moth is on the wing between January to March.

Hosts 
The larval hosts of this species include Polystichum vestitum and Polystrichum richardii. The larvae feed all year round.

References

Ennominae
Moths of New Zealand
Moths described in 1868
Endemic fauna of New Zealand
Taxa named by  Achille Guenée
Endemic moths of New Zealand